Ngapa is a village in Donggala Regency, in the province of Central Sulawesi in eastern Indonesia.

Notes

External links
"Ngapa Map — Satellite Images of Ngapa" Maplandia World Gazetteer

Populated places in Central Sulawesi